Atractocarpus hirtus, commonly known as the hairy gardenia or native loquat, is a plant in the madder family Rubiaceae, a large family of some 6,500 species with a cosmopolitan distribution. This species is endemic to north-east Queensland, Australia.

Description
The stems, leaves and fruits are densely covered in soft hairs, hence the common name.

Flowers are pentamerous and actinomorphic, quite fragrant and borne in small terminal groups.

This species is gynodioecious, that is, individual plants are either female or hermaphroditic.

The body of the fruit is orange and the calyx tube is green.

Flowering occurs from May to November, and fruits ripen from December to August.

Taxonomy
Atractocarpus hirtus was first described as Gardenia hirta in 1869 by Ferdinand von Mueller in his work Fragmenta Phytographiae Australiae (vol. 7), from a specimen collected in 1867 by John Dallachy near the Tully River (then known as the Mackay River). Mueller later transferred it to the genus Randia in his publication Systematic Census of Australian Plants of 1882.

In a 1999 revision of the Australian species of Gardenia and Randia, published in Australian Systematic Botany, the Australian botanist C.F. Puttock reassigned this species and gave it the current combination Atractocarpus hirtus.

Etymology
The genus name Atractocarpus is derived from the Ancient Greek terms atractos, meaning "spindle", and karpos meaning "fruit", and refers to the spindle-shaped fruit of the type species. The species epithet hirtus is a Latin word meaning "hairy".

Distribution and habitat
This species is endemic to a small part of the World Heritage listed Wet Tropics of Queensland, with a range extending from Cape Tribulation in the north to Hinchinbrook Island in the south.

Conservation
Atractocarpus hirtus is listed as least concern by both the IUCN and the Queensland Government's Department of Environment and Science.

Gallery

References

External links
 
 
 View a map of recorded sightings of this species at the Australasian Virtual Herbarium
 View observations of this species on iNaturalist
 View images of this species on Flickriver

hirtus
Endemic flora of Queensland
Taxa named by Ferdinand von Mueller
Taxa named by Christopher Francis Puttock
Plants described in 1999
Gentianales of Australia